Peter Rull may refer to:

 Peter Rull Sr. (1922–2014), Hong Kong sports shooter
 Peter Rull Jr. (born 1945), Hong Kong sports shooter